Campylocarpon fasciculare is a species of parasitic fungus in the family Nectriaceae, and the type species of the genus Campylocarpon. Described as new to science in 2004, it is one of several pathogens associated with black foot disease in grape.

References

External links

Fungi described in 2004
Fungi of North America
Nectriaceae
Grapevine trunk diseases